Classical Marxism refers to the economic, philosophical, and sociological theories expounded by Karl Marx and Friedrich Engels as contrasted with later developments in Marxism, especially Marxism–Leninism.

Classical Marxism is not to be confused with Orthodox Marxism, which is the body of Marxist thought that emerged after Marx's death.

Karl Marx 

Karl Marx (5 May 1818, Trier, Germany – 14 March 1883, London) was an immensely influential German philosopher, sociologist, political economist and revolutionary socialist. Marx addressed a wide range of issues, including alienation and exploitation of the worker, the capitalist mode of production and historical materialism, although he is most famous for his analysis of history in terms of class struggles, summed up in the opening line of the introduction to The Communist Manifesto: "The history of all hitherto existing society is the history of class struggles". The influence of his ideas, already popular during his life, was given added impetus by the victory of the Russian Bolsheviks in 1917 October Revolution and there are few parts of the world which were not significantly touched by Marxian ideas in the course of the twentieth century.

As the American Marx scholar Hal Draper remarked: "[T]here are few thinkers in modern history whose thought has been so badly misrepresented, by Marxists and anti-Marxists alike".

Early influences 

The early influences on Marx are often grouped into three categories, namely German philosophy, English/Scottish political economy and French socialism.

German philosophy 
Main influences include Immanuel Kant, Georg Wilhelm Friedrich Hegel and Ludwig Feuerbach. 

Marx studied under one of Hegel's pupils, Bruno Bauer, a leader of the circle of Young Hegelians to whom Marx attached himself. However, in 1841 he and Engels came to disagree with Bauer and the rest of the Young Hegelians about socialism and also about the usage of Hegel's dialectic and progressively broke away from German idealism and the Young Hegelians. Marx's early writings are thus a response to Hegel, German idealism, and a break with the rest of the Young Hegelians. Marx, "stood Hegel on his head", in his own view of his role by turning the idealistic dialectic into a materialistic one, in proposing that material circumstances shape ideas instead of the other way around. In this, Marx was following the lead of Feuerbach. His theory of alienation, developed in the Economic and Philosophical Manuscripts of 1844 (published in 1932), inspired itself from Feuerbach's critique of the alienation of Man in God through the objectivation of all his inherent characteristics (thus man projected on God all qualities which are in fact man's own quality which defines the "human nature"). But Marx also criticized Feuerbach for being insufficiently materialistic.

English and Scottish political economy 
Main influences include Adam Smith and David Ricardo. 

Marx built on and critiqued the most well-known political economists of his day, the British classical political economists.

Marx critiqued Smith and Ricardo for not realizing that their economic concepts reflected specifically capitalist institutions, not innate natural properties of human society, and could not be applied unchanged to all societies. He proposed a systematic correlation between labor values and money prices. He claimed that the source of profits under capitalism is the value added by workers not paid out in wages. This mechanism operated through the distinction between "labor power", which workers freely exchanged for their wages; and "labour", over which asset-holding capitalists thereby gained control. This practical and theoretical distinction was Marx's primary insight, and allowed him to develop the concept of "surplus value", which distinguished his works from that of Smith and Ricardo.

French socialism 
Main influences include Jean-Jacques Rousseau, Charles Fourier, Henri de Saint-Simon, Pierre-Joseph Proudhon and Louis Blanc.

Rousseau was one of the first modern writers to seriously attack the institution of private property and is sometimes considered a forebear of modern socialism and communism, though Marx rarely mentions Rousseau in his writings.

In 1833, France was experiencing a number of social problems arising out of the Industrial Revolution. A number of sweeping plans of reform were developed by thinkers on the political left. Among the more grandiose were the plans of Charles Fourier and the followers of Saint-Simon. Fourier wanted to replace modern cities with utopian communities while the Saint-Simonians advocated directing the economy by manipulating credit. Although these programs did not have much support, they did expand the political and social imagination of Marx.

Louis Blanc is perhaps best known for originating the social principle, later adopted by Marx, of how labor and income should be distributed: "From each according to his abilities, to each according to his needs".

Pierre-Joseph Proudhon participated in the February 1848 uprising and the composition of what he termed "the first republican proclamation" of the new republic, but he had misgivings about the new government because it was pursuing political reform at the expense of the socio-economic reform, which Proudhon considered basic. Proudhon published his own perspective for reform, Solution du problème social, in which he laid out a program of mutual financial cooperation among workers. He believed this would transfer control of economic relations from capitalists and financiers to workers. It was Proudhon's book What Is Property? that convinced the young Karl Marx that private property should be abolished.

Other influences on Marx 
Main influences includes Friedrich Engels, ancient Greek materialism, Giambattista Vico and Lewis H. Morgan.

Marx's revision of Hegelianism was also influenced by Engels' book  The Condition of the Working Class in England in 1844, which led Marx to conceive of the historical dialectic in terms of class conflict and to see the modern working class as the most progressive force for revolution.

Marx was influenced by Antique materialism, especially Epicurus (to whom Marx dedicated his thesis,  The Difference Between the Democritean and Epicurean Philosophy of Nature, 1841) for his materialism and theory of clinamen which opened up a realm of liberty.

Giambattista Vico propounded a cyclical theory of history, according to which human societies progress through a series of stages from barbarism to civilization and then return to barbarism. In the first stage—called the Age of the Gods—religion, the family and other basic institutions emerge; in the succeeding Age of Heroes, the common people are kept in subjection by a dominant class of nobles; in the final stage—the Age of Men—the people rebel and win equality, but in the process society begins to disintegrate. Vico's influence on Marx is obvious.

Marx drew on Lewis H. Morgan and his social evolution theory. He wrote a collection of notebooks from his reading of Lewis Morgan, but they are regarded as being quite obscure and only available in scholarly editions. (However Engels is much more noticeably influenced by Morgan than Marx).

Friedrich Engels 

Friedrich Engels (28 November 1820, Wuppertal, Prussia – 5 August 1895, London) was a 19th-century German political philosopher. He developed communist theory alongside his better-known collaborator, Karl Marx.

In 1842, his father sent the young Engels to England to help manage his cotton factory in Manchester. Shocked by the widespread poverty, Engels began writing an account which he published in 1845 as The Condition of the Working Class in England in 1844.

In July 1845, Engels went to England, where he met an Irish working-class woman named Mary Burns (Crosby), with whom he lived until her death in 1863 (Carver 2003:19). Later, Engels lived with her sister Lizzie, marrying her the day before she died in 1877 (Carver 2003:42). These women may have introduced him to the Chartist movement, of whose leaders he met several, including George Harney.

Engels actively participated in the Revolution of 1848, taking part in the uprising at Elberfeld. Engels fought in the Baden campaign against the Prussians (June/July 1849) as the aide-de-camp of August Willich, who commanded a Free Corps in the Baden-Palatinate uprising.

Marx and Engels 
Marx and Engels first met in person in September 1844. They discovered that they had similar views on philosophy and on capitalism and decided to work together, producing a number of works including Die heilige Familie (The Holy Family). After the French authorities deported Marx from France in January 1845, Engels and Marx decided to move to Belgium, which then permitted greater freedom of expression than some other countries in Europe. Engels and Marx returned to Brussels in January 1846, where they set up the Communist Correspondence Committee.

In 1847, Engels and Marx began writing a pamphlet together, based on Engels' The Principles of Communism. They completed the 12,000-word pamphlet in six weeks, writing it in such a manner as to make communism understandable to a wide audience and published it as The Communist Manifesto in February 1848. In March, Belgium expelled both Engels and Marx. They moved to Cologne, where they began to publish a radical newspaper, the Neue Rheinische Zeitung. By 1849, both Engels and Marx had to leave Germany and moved to London. The Prussian authorities applied pressure on the British government to expel the two men, but Prime Minister Lord John Russell refused. With only the money that Engels could raise, the Marx family lived in extreme poverty. The contributions of Marx and Engels to the formation of Marxist theory have been described as inseparable.

Main ideas 
Marx's main ideas included:
 Alienation: Marx refers to the alienation of people from aspects of their "human nature" (Gattungswesen, usually translated as "species-essence" or "species-being"). He believed that alienation is a systematic result of capitalism. Under capitalism, the fruits of production belong to the employers, who expropriate the surplus created by others and in so doing generate alienated labour. Alienation describes objective features of a person's situation in capitalism—it is not necessary for them to believe or feel that they are alienated.
 Base and superstructure: Marx and Engels use the “base-structure” concept to explain the idea that the totality of relations among people with regard to “the social production of their existence” forms the economic basis, on which arises a superstructure of political and legal institutions. To the base corresponds the social consciousness which includes religious, philosophical and other main ideas. The base conditions both, the superstructure and the social consciousness. A conflict between the development of material productive forces and the relations of production causes social revolutions and the resulting change in the economic basis will sooner or later lead to the transformation of the superstructure. For Marx, this relationship is not a one way process—it is reflexive and the base determines the superstructure in the first instance at the same time as it remains the foundation of a form of social organization which is itself transformed as an element in the overall dialectical process. The relationship between superstructure and base is considered to be a dialectical one, ineffable in a sense except as it unfolds in its material reality in the actual historical process (which scientific socialism aims to explain and ultimately to guide).
 Class consciousness: class consciousness refers to the awareness, both of itself and of the social world around it, that a social class possesses and its capacity to act in its own rational interests based on this awareness. Thus class consciousness must be attained before the class may mount a successful revolution. However, other methods of revolutionary action have been developed, such as vanguardism.
 Exploitation: Marx refers to the exploitation of an entire segment or class of society by another. He sees it as being an inherent feature and key element of capitalism and free markets. The profit gained by the capitalist is the difference between the value of the product made by the worker and the actual wage that the worker receives—in other words, capitalism functions on the basis of paying workers less than the full value of their labor in order to enable the capitalist class to turn a profit.
 Historical materialism: historical materialism was first articulated by Marx, although he himself never used the term. It looks for the causes of developments and changes in human societies in the way in which humans collectively make the means to life, thus giving an emphasis through economic analysis to everything that co-exists with the economic base of society (e.g. social classes, political structures, ideologies).
 Means of production: the means of production are a combination of the means of labor and the subject of labor used by workers to make products. The means of labor include machines, tools, equipment, infrastructure and "all those things with the aid of which man acts upon the subject of labor, and transforms it". The subject of labor includes raw materials and materials directly taken from nature. Means of production by themselves produce nothing— labor power is needed for production to take place.
 Ideology: without offering a general definition for "ideology", Marx on several instances has used the term to designate the production of images of social reality. According to Engels, “ideology is a process accomplished by the so-called thinker consciously, it is true, but with a false consciousness. The real motive forces impelling him remain unknown to him; otherwise it simply would not be an ideological process. Hence he imagines false or seeming motive forces”. Because the ruling class controls the society's means of production, the superstructure of society as well as its ruling ideas will be determined according to what is in the ruling class's best interests. As Marx said famously in The German Ideology, “the ideas of the ruling class are in every epoch the ruling ideas, i.e. the class which is the ruling material force of society, is at the same time its ruling intellectual force”. Therefore the ideology of a society is of enormous importance since it confuses the alienated groups and can create false consciousness such as commodity fetishism (perceiving labor as capital—a degradation of human life).
 Mode of production: the mode of production is a specific combination of productive forces (including human the means of production and labour power, tools, equipment, buildings and technologies, materials and improved land) and social and technical relations of production (including the property, power and control relations governing society's productive assets, often codified in law, cooperative work relations and forms of association, relations between people and the objects of their work and the relations between social classes).
 Political economy: the term "political economy" originally meant the study of the conditions under which production was organized in the nation-states of the new-born capitalist system. Political economy then studies the mechanism of human activity in organizing material and the mechanism of distributing the surplus or deficit that is the result of that activity. Political economy studies the means of production, specifically capital and how this manifests itself in economic activity.

Marx's concept of class 

Marx believed that class identity was configured in the relations with the mode of production. In other words, a class is a collective of individuals who have a similar relationship with the means of production (as opposed to the more common idea that class is determined by wealth alone, i.e. high class, middle class and poor class).

Marx describes several social classes in capitalist societies, including primarily:
 The proletariat: "those individuals who sell their labor power, (and therefore add value to the products), and who, in the capitalist mode of production, do not own the means of production". According to Marx, the capitalist mode of production establishes the conditions for the bourgeoisie to exploit the proletariat due to the fact that the worker's labor power generates an added value greater than his salary.
 The bourgeoisie: those who "own the means of production" and buy labor power from the proletariat, who are recompensed by a salary, thus exploiting the proletariat.
The bourgeoisie may be further subdivided into the very wealthy bourgeoisie and the petty bourgeoisie. The petty bourgeoisie are those who employ labor, but may also work themselves. These may be small proprietors, land-holding peasants, or trade workers. Marx predicted that the petty bourgeoisie would eventually be destroyed by the constant reinvention of the means of production and the result of this would be the forced movement of the vast majority of the petty bourgeoisie to the proletariat. Marx also identified the lumpenproletariat, a stratum of society completely disconnected from the means of production.

Marx also describes the communists as separate from the oppressed proletariat. The communists were to be a unifying party among the proletariat; they were educated revolutionaries who could bring the proletariat to revolution and help them establish the democratic dictatorship of the proletariat. According to Marx, the communists would support any true revolution of the proletariat against the bourgeoisie. Thus the communists aide the proletariat in creating the inevitable classless society.

Marx's theory of history 

The Marxist theory of historical materialism understands society as fundamentally determined by the material conditions at any given time—this means the relationships which people enter into with one another in order to fulfill their basic needs, for instance to feed and clothe themselves and their families. In general, Marx and Engels identified five successive stages of the development of these material conditions in Western Europe.
 Primitive communism
 Asiatic
 Ancient slave society
 Feudalism
 Modern bourgeois society

See also 
 Marxian economics

References 

Eponymous economic ideologies
Karl Marx
Marxist schools of thought
Social theories
Sociological theories
Types of socialism